The 2016 World RX of Barcelona was the ninth round of the third season of the FIA World Rallycross Championship and the seventh round of the forty-first season of the FIA European Rallycross Championship. The event was held at the Circuit de Barcelona-Catalunya in Montmeló, Barcelona.

Supercar

Heats

Semi-finals
Semi-Final 1

Semi-Final 2

Final

RX Lites

Heats

Semi-finals
Semi-Final 1

Semi-Final 2

Final

Standings after the event

Supercar standings

RX Lites standings

 Note: Only the top five positions are included.

References

External links

|- style="text-align:center"
|width="35%"|Previous race:2016 World RX of France
|width="40%"|FIA World Rallycross Championship2016 season
|width="35%"|Next race:2016 World RX of Latvia
|- style="text-align:center"
|width="35%"|Previous race:2015 World RX of Barcelona
|width="40%"|World RX of Barcelona
|width="35%"|Next race:2017 World RX of Barcelona
|- style="text-align:center"

Barcelona
World RX
World RX